North Bay Airport or North Bay/Jack Garland Airport  in North Bay, Ontario, Canada is located at Hornell Heights,  north-northeast of the city. It is located adjacent to Canadian Forces Base North Bay, operational since 1951 (as RCAF Station North Bay until 1966), the operational control centre for Canadian operations of the North American Aerospace Defense Command.

The airport is named in memory of Jack Garland, a longtime Member of Parliament for North Bay's Nipissing electoral district. Until 2004 it hosted an annual air show during North Bay's Heritage Festival, with a large military component.

The airport is classified as an airport of entry by Nav Canada and is staffed by the Canada Border Services Agency (CBSA). CBSA officers at this airport can handle general aviation aircraft only, with no more than 15 passengers.

The airport is home to the Canadore College's aviation campus which houses their aviation programs. Final assembly of the Canadair CL-415 (Bombardier 415) aircraft was completed at the airport from 1999 until 2015.

The city has owned the airport since 1998 after transfer from Transport Canada and North Bay Jack Garland Airport Corporation has run it since 2003.

Airlines and destinations

Passenger

Cargo

Terminal

The first terminal was constructed in 1938 to house a small waiting area on the ground floor and control tower on the second. Upgrades after World War II led to the second terminal being built in 1963, which now serves as the Administration Building and has offices for airport administration, Nav Canada, Canada Border Services Agency, and others. The current terminal was built in 2001 and has been renovated (completed 2010) to accommodate additional airline offices, a larger post screening waiting area with washrooms. The North Bay Jack Garland Airport terminal is easily accessible, with curbside access and automatic doors throughout, and now has:

 Two airline departure gates
 Six airline check-in counters
 Rental car kiosk – servicing both National Car Rental and Enterprise Rent-A-Car 
 Restaurant and bar
 Lounges / waiting area
 Baby / parent room – both before and post screening
 Disabled access / facilities – both before and post-screening
 Taxi stand

The airport, operated by the North Bay Jack Garland Airport Corporation, is certified by Transport Canada.

Infrastructure

Besides travel by car, the airport is serviced by local taxis and North Bay Transit. An outdoor parking lot next to the terminal has approximately 200 regular and four accessible spots. Long term parking is available next to the Administration Building (Lot B).

Runways
 Runway 08/26: , paved, lighted, Precision Approach Path Indicator (PAPI) type 1 approach lighting for both ends, Instrument landing system (ILS), no curfew
 Runway 18/36:  paved, lighted, PAPI type 1 approach lighting for both ends
 Runway 13/31: , turf, unlighted, glider operations only

Communications
 Mandatory Frequency/ATF: North Bay Radio/Traffic, 118.3 MHz
 Remote communications outlet (RCO): London Radio, 123.55 MHz
 Automatic terminal information service (ATIS): 124.9 MHz
 PAL: Toronto Area Control Centre, 127.250 MHz
 Automated airport weather station (AWOS) 124.9 MHz

Navigation aids
 Non-directional beacon (NDB)s: YELLEK (ZYB), 404 kHz,  77° to airport
 VHF omnidirectional range (VOR)/Distance measuring equipment (DME): North Bay (YYB), 115.4 MHz/Channel 101, at airport
 ILS: Runway 08, 110.9 MHz

General
 Latitude/longitude: 
 Elevation:  AMSL
 Magnetic variation: 11° west

FBOs
Overnight parking is available through the main airport authority.
 Weisflock Aviation : Avgas (100LL) and Jet-A fuel
 Voyageur Airport Services (WorldFuel): Jet-A ,FBO and De-icing 705-482-7435

Bombardier Aerospace
Bombardier Aerospace assembled the CL-415 water bomber at the airport until production ended in 2015.

See also
 North Bay Water Aerodrome

References

External links
 
 
 North Bay Airport at the city website

Certified airports in Ontario
Buildings and structures in North Bay, Ontario
Transport in North Bay, Ontario
Airports in Nipissing District